Prasthanam is a 2010 Indian Telugu-language political action drama film written and directed by Deva Katta. The film was produced by Ravi Vallabhaneni under VRC Media & Entertainment banner. The film stars Sharwanand, Sai Kumar, Sundeep Kishan (in his career acting debut) and Ruby Parihar. The film received generally positive response upon release with praise for Sai Kumar's performance. The film won two Filmfare Awards South, two Nandi Awards and was also selected for screening in the Indian Panorama section at International Film Festival of India, Goa. The film was dubbed and released in Tamil as Padhavi. It was dubbed into hindi as "Asteen Ka Saanp".

Katta remade Prasthanam in Hindi with the same title in 2019. The film is considered one of the "25 Greatest Telugu Films Of The Decade" by Film Companion.

Plot
Ketti Lokanatham Naidu alias Loki, takes over the reins of a rural political party from a dying Dasharatha Rama Naidu. On his deathbed, Rama Naidu requests Loki to marry his widowed daughter-in-law, Savitri, whose husband and his son, Keshava Naidu, was attacked and killed by a rival political group. Loki complies. 25 years later in Vijayawada, Loki is now the next potential Chief Minister candidate.

Loki's stepson is Mitranand, and his biological son is Chinna. While Mitra is a devoted and loving stepson to Loki, his stepdaughter, Valli, hates him for marrying their mother and severs ties with them. Loki wants to see Mitra as his heir because he is a thinking and sensible man, whereas Chinna is hot-blooded with a negligent lifestyle. Chinna loathes Mitra, because he receives lesser attention than Mitra, from Loki, and is constantly discouraged by his father from entering politics. Valli's sister-in-law, Latha, is Mitra's girlfriend. Chinna gets upset on learning that Mitra is now the new youth president of the party. 

That same night, he takes drugs and forcefully sleeps with Hameed Basha's daughter, Nadia. Upon waking up, she throws a beer bottle to attract Chinna's friends. As they drive her to the hospital, the car gets overturned, due to driving at a high speed. Though Chinna and his friends get out of the car, unscathed, Nadia is injured and barely alive. Chinna's friends convince him to leave the spot, because even if they admit Nadia in the hospital, a police case will be filed, due to the extent of her injuries. Chinna and his friends leave, as the car catches on fire. The next day, Chinna hides in the hospital where Valli works. Upon finding him, he admits to her what had happened. In return, she chastises and threatens him, by calling the police. As news reporters telecast Chinna running away from the hospital, Basha tries to attack him, only to be stabbed by Chinna. All of this is caught on-live. The entire state gets to know about Chinna's actions, as a result.

Mitra wants to punish Chinna for this act, while Chinna tries to get Mitra killed. Chinna then kills Valli and her husband, for looking down on him. As a twist in the tale, Loki sacrifices his political goodwill to protect Chinna. By doing so, he and Mitra are forced to confront each other. Loki has Mitra beaten up, when Mitra chases after Chinna to avenge Valli. Mitra leaves the house, moves to his old home in the village, and tries to kill Chinna, but cannot bring himself to do it. That same moment, Basha shows up and finishes the deed. Loki orders both Mitra and Basha to be killed, in the village. Basha saves Mitra from the goons and reveals to him that Loki had killed Mitra's biological father, Keshava Naidu, out of jealousy and greed, as they were taking taking him to the hospital, after he got severely injured from the attack of the rival political party. Because he was next to the throne, in his grandfathers political party, Loki had to gain goodwill from Rama Naidu. Mitra confronts Loki and tells him that no amount of reading puranas will absolve him of his heinous character.

Loki then tells him to go beyond the puranas as there are no villains or heroes, rather, ordinary people committing sins to fulfill their goals. Loki then tries to kill Basha, but Mitra snatches the gun from him. Mitra falls down on Loki's feet and admits that Loki is the only father he has ever known, and even if Keshava Naidu had lived, Mitra would not have loved him as much as Loki. Mitra tells Loki that he still loves him, but does not hate him enough to kill him. Mitra and Basha leave. Soon after, Loki shoots himself, out of disgrace.

Cast

 Sharwanand as Galla Mitranand Naidu alias Mitra, Loki's stepson, Valli's brother, and Chinna's step-brother
 Sai Kumar as Ketti Lokanatham Naidu alias Loki, Mitra and Valli's step-father, and China's father
 Sundeep Kishan as Chinna
 Ruby Parihar as Latha, Mitra's girlfriend
 Rashmi Gautam as Nadia Basha
 Madhusudhan Rao as Hameed Basha
 Vennela Kishore as Goli
 Pavitra Lokesh as Savitri, Keshava's wife, then Loki's wife, Mitra, Valli, and Chinna's mother
 Surekha Vani as Valli, Mitra's sister, and Chinna's step-sister
 Jaya Prakash Reddy as Bangaru Naidu
 Vennela Kishore as Goli
 Mannava Balayya as Dasharatha Rama Naidu
 Ravi Prakash as Galla Keshava Naidu, Dasharatha's son and Savitri's husband
 Jeeva as Reddy
 Natasha Valluri as Nikki
 Prudhvi Raj
 Dil Ramesh

Themes

The movie, on one hand, deals with politics at grass root levels that occur in villages of India, corrupt political system and the nexus between businessmen and politicians. On the other hand, the movie deals with themes like greed, ambition and devotion which are driving forces of the lead characters in this movie. A movie-buff argues that the central theme revolves around the quote from the Book of Exodus, Old Testament, –"The sins of the fathers shall be visited upon the children."

Soundtrack
The music was composed by Mahesh Shankar and released by T-Series.

Reception
Despite fierce competition from other big budget films, like Simha and Darling, it did modestly well at the box office.

Awards
Nandi Awards
 2010 - Third Best Feature Film - Bronze - Ravi Vallabhaneni 
 2010 - Best  Supporting Actor - Sai Kumar

Filmfare Awards South
 2010 - Filmfare Award for Best Supporting Actor (Telugu) - Sai Kumar
 2010 - Filmfare South Critics Award for Best film - Deva Katta

See also
 Vennela
 Jilla

References

External links
 

2010 films
2010s Telugu-language films
2010 action drama films
2010s political drama films
Indian action drama films
Indian political drama films
Political action films
Telugu films remade in other languages
Films directed by Deva Katta